Gramade may refer to:
 Gramađe , Serbia
 Gramade, Smolyan Province in Rudozem, a town in southern Bulgaria